Svatby pana Voka  (Weddings of Mr. Vok) is a 1970 Czechoslovak comedy film describing love adventures of the Bohemian nobleman Peter Vok of Rosenberg. The screenplay was written by Jan Procházka and it was  directed by Karel Steklý.

Cast
 Miloš Kopecký as Peter Vok of Rosenberg 
 Pavel Landovský as the Emperor Rudolph II
 Karel Augusta as countryman Prokop
 Stanislava Bartošová as a girl Madlenka
 Vlastimil Bedrna as armoured man at the bridge
 Karel Bělohradský as nobleman on a horse
 Jana Bittlová as innkeeper
 Vladimír Brabec as chancellor Slavata
 Václav Brichnáč as servant
 Otakar Brousek Sr. as William of Rosenberg

References

External links
 

1970 films
1970 comedy films
Czechoslovak comedy films
1970s Czech-language films
Films directed by Karel Steklý
Czech comedy films
Cultural depictions of Rudolf II, Holy Roman Emperor
1970s Czech films